Bonavista (2021 population: 3,190) is a town on the Bonavista Peninsula, Newfoundland in the Canadian province of Newfoundland and Labrador. Bonavista is located approximately 300 km from the provincial capital of St. John's.

History
John Cabot (Giovanni Caboto), a freelance Italian explorer, was contracted by England's Henry VII to find new lands, and a sea route to the Orient. Cabot set sail from Bristol, England in his ship the Matthew in 1497. When Cabot first saw land he reputedly said "O Buon Vista" ("Oh, Happy Sight!") giving rise to the name of the town and nearby Cape Bonavista. Cabot landed with "a crucifix and raised banners with the arms of the Holy Father and those of the King of England". The land was inhabited, as the expedition found a trail leading inland, a site where a fire had been, and "a stick half a yard long pierced at both ends, carved and painted with brazil".
The harbour was not ideal, eventually requiring the construction of several breakwaters. Despite this Bonavista became one of the most important towns in Newfoundland due to its proximity to the rich fishing and sealing grounds to the north of the peninsula. The Spanish, Portuguese, Dutch, French and English fished off Cape Bonavista during the 16th century, but the Spanish and Portuguese presence soon declined, leaving the French and English as the dominant powers. Tension between the French and English sometimes resulted in military action, including an unsuccessful attempt in 1704 by the French to burn the town. The French Shore, which had Bonavista as its eastern terminus, was established by the Treaty of Utrecht in 1713. Fishing rights in the area continued to be a source of tension between the French and English.

Bonavista was a major commercial centre and the evidence for this is preserved at the Ryan Premises, a National Historic Site maintained by Parks Canada. It is a restored example of a large fish merchant's operation.

Bonavista's status was further enhanced by the development of the Fishermen's Protective Union in the early 20th century, and the creation of nearby Port Union. During the peak years of 1891–1901, the Bonavista Peninsula's population of about 20,000 was centred in Bonavista. The Bonavista Cold Storage Co. fish plant, now a Fishery Products International operation, became the centre of fishery production after the decline of salt fish markets.

In 1722 the first school in Newfoundland was built in Bonavista by Rev. Henry Jones.

In the twentieth century the town's economy switched to being tourism-focused.  In 2023, it was reported that up to 80,000 visited each summer, leading to many houses to be converted into vacation rentals (more than 120 in 2023).  These conversions flipped the housing market of the house, which twenty years earlier had seen many vacant houses, into one of shortage.  As of 2023 a freeze on new vacation rental conversions was declared.

Demographics

Climate
Bonavista has a subarctic climate (Dfc) due to its cold water temperatures surrounding the location, keeping June temperatures below  in terms of mean temperatures. Although winters are relatively mild by Canadian standards, there is heavy snowfall and frequent cold days. Winter lasts from December through April.

Attractions

The Ryan Premises
The Matthew Replica
The Mockbeggar Plantation
The Dungeon
White Rock Murals
Cape Bonavista Light
Bonavista Archives
Cabot Stadium
Puffins, whales, and icebergs

Notable people
 Adam Pardy, National Hockey League player
 Michael Ryder, National Hockey League player

See also
 Upper Amherst Cove
Heritage Foundation of Newfoundland and Labrador
List of municipalities in Newfoundland and Labrador

References

External links

Town of Bonvaista Website

Populated coastal places in Canada
Towns in Newfoundland and Labrador
Fishing communities in Canada